Ian D. Clark is a professor in the Department of Earth Sciences at the University of Ottawa (Canada), who has been publishing research on geoscience, groundwater and geochemistry since 1982, and is currently teaching GEO 1111 with David Schneider. His graduate work in isotope hydrogeology was at the University of Waterloo and the University of Paris.

Clark, who is not a climatologist, is among the scientists who reject the mainstream scientific consensus on climate change; in the 2007 UK television documentary The Great Global Warming Swindle, he asserted that changes in global temperature correlate with solar activity, saying "Solar activity of the last hundred years, over the last several hundred years correlates very nicely on a decadal basis, with sea ice and Arctic temperatures."

Works
Ian Clark Groundwater Geochemistry and Isotopes, 2015, 
Ian Clark and Peter Fritz, Environmental Isotopes in Hydrogeology, 1997, .
Ian Clark et al., 2015. Paleozoic-aged microbial methane in an Ordovician shale and carbonate aquiclude of the Michigan Basin, Southwestern Ontario. Organic Geochemistry. 83-84: 118-126.
Ian Clark et al., 2013. Paleozoic-aged brine and authigenic helium preserved in an Ordovician shale aquiclude. Geology, 41: 951-954
Ian Clark and B Lauriol, "Aufeis of the Firth River basin, northern Yukon, Canada: insights to permafrost hydrogeology and karst". Arctic and Alpine Research, 29: 240-252, 1997.
Ian Clark, B Lauriol, L Harwood, M Marschner, "Groundwater Contributions to Discharge in a Permafrost Setting, Big Fish River, NWT, Canada", Arctic, Antarctic, and Alpine Research, 33: 62-69, 2001.
B Lauriol, ID Clark. An approach to determine the origin and age of massive ice blockage in two Arctic caves, Permafrost and Periglacial Processes, 1993.
I Clark, B Lauriol, M Marschner, N Sabourin, et al. Endostromatolites from permafrost karst, Yukon, Canada, Canadian Journal of Earth Sciences, 2004.
D Lacelle, B Lauriol, ID Clark, "Seasonal isotopic imprint in moonmilk from Caverne de l’Ours (Quebec, Canada): implications for climatic reconstruction". Canadian Journal of Earth Science, 41: 1411-1423, 2004.
ID Clark, L Henderson, J Chappellaz, D Fisher et al., "CO2 isotopes as tracers of firn air diffusion and age in an Arctic ice cap with summer melting, Devon Island, Canada". Journal of Geophysical Research'' 112, D01301, 2007.

See also
 List of University of Waterloo people

References

External links
"Professor Ian Clark: Research Interests", University of Ottawa, uOttawa.ca, 2009, webpage: uOtt-clark-research.

Canadian geologists
University of Waterloo alumni
Academic staff of the University of Ottawa
Living people
1954 births
Hydrogeologists
University of Paris alumni
Canadian expatriates in France